College of Applied Science, Thamarassery  also known as IHRD Thamarassery or CAS Thamarassery,  is a degree-awarding educational institution located in Korangad  Near Thamarassery town in Kozhikode district of Kerala. The college was established in the year 2012 providing various Undergraduate and Postgraduate Courses. IHRD initiated a Technical Higher Secondary School as the first venture in the year 2004 and successfully produced 17 batches of students in two different streams. It was upgraded to a college to meet the growing demand of the parents as there were no colleges available in the 20 kilometer vicinity. It made a simple beginning with two batches, BSc Computer Science and BCom with Computer Application and a sanctioned strength of 64 students. Two more courses, BCA and BA Literature were added in the year 2013 and BBA in 2014. The college passed yet another milestone in the short span of 4 years by further upgrading to a Post- Graduate institution with two PG courses, MA Literature and MCom. The total number of intake last year alone was 287, taking the total number of students in the institution to a whopping 750. CAS Thamarassery has established itself as a premier IHRD institution within a limited number of years. The college  is managed by the Institute of Human Resources Development (IHRD) and is affiliated to the University of Calicut.

Courses offered

Facilities 

 Computer Lab
 Electronic Lab
 Library
 seminar Hall
 Auditorium

How to reach 
College of applied science calicut is located in Korangad  just near to thamarassery town

Nearest Railway Station : Koyilandi Railway Station

Nearst Bus Stand : Thamarassery Bus Stand

Nearest Airport : Calicut International Airport Karipur

Nearest Hospital : Chavara Hospital Chungam

References 

Educational institutions established in 2012
Institute of Human Resources Development
Colleges affiliated with the University of Calicut
Arts and Science colleges in Kerala
Universities and colleges in Kozhikode district
2012 establishments in Kerala
Thamarassery area